Golden Grove is a settlement in the parish of Saint Thomas, Jamaica. Historically a sugar plantation, it had a population of 3,057 in 2009.

History
It was established in 1734 as a sugar estate by Attorney General of Jamaica Andrew Arcedeckne, and was subsequently run by his son Chaloner Arcedeckne. In 1775, John Kelly (the supervisor of the plantation) recorded a total yield of 740 hogshead of sugar, more than double that of 1769 (350). However, estate owner Simon Taylor expressly disagreed with Kelly's overworking of the slaves on the plantation, arguing that they would be "killed by overwork and harassed to Death".

A chalice inscribed with the line "Purchased by the slaves of the Golden Grove" was created in 1830 for church-going slaves in Golden Grove to receive the Eucharist; it is now housed in the Golden Grove Church by the Diocese of Jamaica and the Cayman Islands.

The Golden Grove Sugar Factory, established in 1924, was the only sugar-manufacturing plant in eastern Jamaica until its closure in July 2019.

Geography
The banana-handling port, Port Morant, is located in Bowden, Golden Grove. A path starting from Golden Grove leads to the -tall Morant Point lighthouse cast in London, England in 1841. According to a 2009 census, Golden Grove had a population of 3,057.

Reception
A 2000 travel guide described Golden Grove as "rather shabby", adding that tourists "won't want to stop here".

References

Populated places in Jamaica